Longmore House, formerly Longmore Hospital, on Salisbury Place, Newington, Edinburgh, is the headquarters of Historic Environment Scotland. The property is designated a Category B listed building.

History
The hospital has its origins in a facility commissioned by the newly-formed Edinburgh Association for Incurables which opened in Salisbury Place in 1875. The trustees decided to rebuild the facility, financed by a bequest from John Longmore and using a neoclassical design by John More Dick Peddie: the new building was completed in December 1880. A new East Wing was opened by the Duke of York and Princess Mary in 1891 and the West Wing was completed in 1899.

In 1903 the Edinburgh Association for Incurables received a royal charter and, after the Liberton Hospital opened in 1906, the two hospitals together became known as the Royal Edinburgh Hospital for Incurables. The hospital joined the National Health Service in 1948.

After services transferred to the Western General Hospital, the hospital closed in 1991. The building was converted to offices for Historic Scotland in 1994 and, since 2015, has been occupied by its successor organisation, Historic Environment Scotland.

See also
 List of hospitals in Scotland

References

Hospital buildings completed in 1880
Hospital buildings completed in 1899
Organisations based in Edinburgh with royal patronage
Category B listed buildings in Edinburgh
Listed hospital buildings in Scotland
Historic Environment Scotland
Hospitals established in 1875
1875 establishments in Scotland
Defunct hospitals in Scotland
Neoclassical architecture in Scotland